Sparganothoides canorisana is a species of moth of the family Tortricidae. It is found in Mexico (Tamaulipas, San Luis Potosí and Veracruz) and Guatemala.

The length of the forewings is 8.8–9.8 mm for males and about 10.2 mm for females. The ground colour of the forewings is yellowish brown to brown with a slight orange tinge and with a heavy scattering of brown scales and spots. The hindwings are grey. Adults have been recorded on wing in June, July, August and December. There are probably two or even multiple generations per year.

Etymology
The species name refers to the enlarged apices of the socii/gnathos arms that resemble the treble clef musical symbol and is derived from Latin canor (meaning melody).

References

Moths described in 2009
Sparganothoides